JD Motorsports, is an American professional stock car racing team that currently competes in the NASCAR Xfinity Series. It is owned and operated by Johnny Davis. It currently fields two Chevrolet Camaro SS teams: The No. 4 for Bayley Currey and Garrett Smithley, and the No. 6 for Brennan Poole, as well as the No. 0 part-time. The team purchases engines from Clements Racing Engines. Jeremy Clements drove for JD Motorsports in the past.

Johnny Davis has been affiliated with NASCAR competition for over 30 years, serving as a crew member, fabricator, and then crew chief for several Cup Series and Xfinity Series teams. Davis' first foray into team ownership was with competition Go-Karts in the 1990s. The team has since expanded and is located in a state-of-the-art 40,000+ square foot facility in Gaffney, South Carolina. The team made history by having the first female crew chief in 2008 and building the first Nationwide Series Car of Tomorrow. The team is also known for running extremely well at restrictor-plate tracks. JD Motorsports entries have led laps in 5 of the last 6 races at Daytona and Talladega with Mike Wallace driving.

Car No. 0 history
Kertus Davis (2002)
The No. 0 car made its debut in 2002, fielding an entry for Davis' son Kertus. In his first race, he started 31st but finished 32nd after a wreck. He ran three more races that season and had the best finish of twenty-fourth at Memphis Motorsports Park after gaining sponsorship from Broadway Motors.

Morgan Shepherd and Jason White (2003)
In 2003, Eagle Jet International became the team's new sponsor, and Morgan Shepherd was hired as the team's driver for most of its races. His best finish came at Talladega Superspeedway, where he finished 11th, when J. R. Robbs took over for three races with a best finish of 27th. Jason White then became the team's regular driver, and Shepherd moved to Davis' new No. 70 team. White drove for most of the season and had two top-twenty finishes in the No. 0 car, before Gus Wasson finished out the year in the car, finishing 29th at Atlanta Motor Speedway.

Jason Schuler and Gus Wasson (2004)
In 2004, the No. 0 switched to the No. 10 and the No. 70 the No. 0, and Jason Schuler began the year with the team with Operation Fire SAFE as a sponsor. After six races and the best finish of 27th, he was replaced by Wasson with Race Girl sponsorship. He ran for most of the season in the ten car, replaced once by Tina Gordon. His best finish that season came at Nashville Superspeedway, where he finished 22nd.

Kertus Davis (2005–2006)
For the 2005 season, the No. 10 returned to its original No. 0.  Kertus Davis began driving the No. 0 full-time with Race Girl sponsoring. He competed in twenty-eight races with a top-ten at Talladega for his rookie season, and Rafael Martínez and Joe Fox served as relief drivers on road courses.

The team began the 2006 season under rumors that they would close due to sponsorship issues but remained open. Davis qualified for twenty-two races in that year, sharing the ride with Randy LaJoie and Morgan Shepherd.

Eric McClure (2007)
Kertus Davis left for Kevin Harvick Incorporated in 2007 and was replaced by Eric McClure and Hefty sponsorship. J. R. Fitzpatrick drove at Mexico City and Montreal, while Kevin Lepage driving at Watkins Glen. At the end of the 2007 season, McClure and his sponsorship departed for Front Row Motorsports. Due to a lack of sponsorship, it was announced on Jayski's Silly Season Site that JDM's equipment would be auctioned off on December 1, although the team remained open.

Multiple drivers (2008–2011)
The No. 0 team began the 2008 season with Kertus Davis qualifying at Daytona, however, his time was disallowed and he moved to the No. 01. Since Daytona, Dwayne Leik has run four races, Mike Potter has run two races, Danny Efland has been in the car for five races and Davis returned to the No. 0 car at Dover for one race. Larry Gunselman drove the car regularly for the balance of the season, with Wheeler Boys filling in on road courses. Danny O’Quinn Jr. began the season as the driver of the No. 0 car but moved over to the No. 01 after one race. J. C. Stout, Robert Richardson, Mark Green and Steve Grissom shared the car before Mike Wallace took over the driving duties. The team starts and parks on occasion in 2009, however, the team did manage to finish at Kentucky. After Wallace moved to the 01, Andy Lally, Stout and Jeremy Clements drove.

In 2011, James Hylton ran the car at Darlington as a start and park. Tim Schendel and Brad Teague also started and parked at Iowa and Dover respectively.

Harrison Rhodes (2015)
For 2015, JD Motorsports announced that Harrison Rhodes would be their third full-time driver with the No. 0 Chevrolet Camaro. ARCA regular Bobby Gerhart would replace Rhodes in the 0 while he is driving the 4 with Ross Chastain being moved to the 01. Rhodes finished in the top 10 at Daytona, the same race where teammate Garrett Smithley finished fifth.

Garrett Smithley (2016–2019)
The following year, Eric McClure, who previously drove this team since 2007, joined the team for the season opener at Daytona in the No. 0, while Garrett Smithley took over the week after, competing for Rookie of the Year honors. From 2016 to 2019 Smithley drove most races in the 0, producing a best finish of fifth at Daytona in 2017, before getting replaced by B. J. McLeod in 2020.

Jeffrey Earnhardt (2020–2021)
B. J. McLeod drove this car for the first 4 races this season before moving to the 6 car. Jeffrey Earnhardt later drove this car for the rest of the season except road-course tracks while Mike Wallace drove this car. Wallace was later suspended indefinitely by NASCAR for actions detrimental to stock car racing, which led Jeffrey Earnhardt to run the car for the rest of the season, including Talladega. Earnhardt returned in 2021 but left to join Sam Hunt Racing's No. 24 and 26 cars on a limited schedule for the 2022 season.

Car No. 0 results

Car No. 04 history

No. 70 (2003)
In mid-2003, Johnny Davis created a second car, then No. 70, for Morgan Shepherd to drive when Jason White was hired to pilot the primary No. 0 car. Shepherd would qualify for three races in the No. 70 before he left to drive for Dwayne Miller. Other drivers who drove the No. 70 for the remainder of 2003 were Jason Rudd, Don Satterfield, Jason White, Brad Teague, and Gus Wasson.

No. 0 (2004)
In 2004, the Davis' primary No. 0 car switched to the No. 10, and the No. 70 became the No. 0. Jimmy Kitchens drove the No. 0 car for the first four races of the season, but did not finish a race. Greg Sacks and Blake Mallory attempted a few races in the car but did not qualify. Mike Potter drove the car for two races before Kertus Davis came back to drive three times late in the season.

No. 00 (2007)
The team would shut down at the end of the season with the team focusing instead on its purchase of the No. 01 car. Davis would enter a third car No. 00 for Mike Potter at the Milwaukee Mile in 2007 to fill out short Busch Series field.

No. 04 (2009–2010)
The team would be revived in 2009 with Mark Green   driving the No. 04 at Talladega, but lose an engine. Kertus Davis took over the car after leaving Jay Robinson Racing starting with Milwaukee and will drive it for at least 3 races.

In 2010, the team returned for Brad Teague, Jeremy Clements, and Kevin Lepage.

Car No. 70/0/00/04 results

Car No. 4 history

Throughout the team's history, the No. 4 car has been the most competitive and successful.

Multiple drivers (2012–2013)
In early February 2012, it was announced that JD Motorsports would field the No. 4, primarily for Danny Efland and Daryl Harr. Steve Wallace drove the car as a Ford at the spring Richmond race with his father's team, and Jeremy Clements drove the car at Indianapolis and Richmond when Ty Dillon was driving the No. 51 (under RCR)

For 2013, Danny Efland ran the car at Daytona, finishing 25th. Daryl Harr then ran the next four races with a best finish of 28th at Fontana. Landon Cassill joined the team in March for the remainder of the season. Cassill ran 23 races for the team, and managed to finish 24th in points despite missing 10 races. He would move over to the 01 car for 2014.

Jeffrey Earnhardt (2014)
Jeffrey Earnhardt joined the team in 2014 to pilot the No. 4 car, with sponsorship from Warrior 50, a non-profit organization honoring Vietnam War veterans. Perdue Foods came on to sponsor the car at Richmond in April. The Great RV Outdoors Store sponsored the car for the Zippo 200 at Watkins Glen International. In July, Earnhardt was injured in a motorcycle accident, breaking his collarbone. Matt DiBenedetto relieved him during the July Daytona race after 53 laps. After being relieved in two more races, Earnhardt was cleared to run the full race at Indianapolis.

Ross Chastain (2015–2019)

For 2015, Ross Chastain drove the No. 4 Chevrolet Camaro and replaced Jeffrey Earnhardt. Chastain scored a few top tens and finished 15th in points in his first year with the team. Chastain regressed in 2016, with no top tens and finishing 16th in points, though this was the best of all of the JD teams. In 2017, Chastain had his best season so far. He scored a top 5 at Iowa and 2 top tens and finished a career-high 13th in points, beating J. J. Yeley to be the highest non-playoff driver in points. Chastain will return in 2018. Chastain ran 30 races in the No. 4, moving to Chip Ganassi Racing and their No. 42 entry for 3 races. Garrett Smithley drove the remaining three races. In 2018, Chastain gave JD Motorsports their first playoff appearance ever as one of the top twelve drivers in the regular season, though he was eliminated in the first round.

Chastain was to run Chip Ganassi Racing's No. 42 full-time in 2019 but these plans were scrapped when the team had to shut down their Xfinity Series operation due to their sponsor DC Solar’s legal troubles. Chastain moved back to the No. 4 initial as a full-time driver before deciding to focus on his Truck Series campaign with Niece Motorsports.

Jesse Little (2020)
On November 7, 2019, It was announced that Jesse Little would race in the No. 4 full-time for the team in the NASCAR Xfinity Series starting in 2020.

Landon Cassill (2021) 
On January 22, 2021, it was announced that Landon Cassill would drive the No. 4 full-time for the team in the 2021 NASCAR Xfinity Series. Cassill left the team at the end of year to drive Kaulig Racing's No. 10, bringing cryptocurrency Voyager with him.

Bayley Currey (2022)
Bayley Currey would drive the 4 in 2022.

Bayley Currey would be contracted full-time for the number 4 team in 2023.

Car No. 4 results

Car No. 6 history

No. 01

Duesenberg & Leik Motorsports (2006)
The No. 01 debuted in 2006 as Duesenberg & Leik Motorsports, with Jay Sauter driving the Western Union car. In the team's first season, the No. 01 team started 33 out of 35 races, with the best finish of seventh at Lucas Oil Indianapolis Raceway Park. Dwayne Leik also made one start, at the Winn-Dixie 250 in the No. 26. He started 38th and finished 32nd.

Multiple drivers (2007–2008)
For the 2007 season, Duesenberg & Leik merged with Davis' operation, with the owner's points for the 2006 season for the 01 were transferred to the 0 car. Morgan Shepherd drove the 01 on a limited basis. Kevin Lepage, Shelby Howard and Danny Efland also drove in 2007 after Shepherd left to drive for his team.    Joe Fox at Montreal and Watkins Glen. Kertus Davis returned after being released from KHI and drove at Michigan, California, Kansas, and Charlotte.

Dwayne Leik qualified the No. 01 at Daytona to start 2008, but was replaced by Davis after the No. 0 time was disallowed. Davis continued to run in the No. 01 full-time since moving to the No. 01 at Daytona. J. C. Stout raced the No. 01 car at Dover, shortly before Davis announced he was leaving the team for Jay Robinson Racing. The car was 29th in owner points when Davis left. A variety of drivers drove the car including Trevor Boys at Montreal and his son Wheeler Boys at Watkins Glen. Danny Efland became the regular driver for the rest of the season.

Danny O'Quinn Jr. (2009)
In 2009 Mike Wallace drove the 01 at Daytona before O’Quinn  became the team's full-time driver. Cash4Gold.com, the American Basketball Association, and Sun Drop served as the team's regular sponsors. O'Quinn left the team late in the season and was replaced by his teammate Wallace.

Mike Wallace (2009–2013)
Wallace ran the final 10 races of the season in 2009, finishing 35th in points. Wallace ran the No. 01 full-time in 2010, getting the team up to eighth in points after Nashville, but they soon fell back and finished 18th in points.

Wallace returned to the 01 for 2011, gaining sponsorship from G&K Services. The team was battling for the win at Talladega, but the 01 flipped on its roof on the last lap, but Wallace drove the battered car to a 17th-place finish. Midway through 2011, the team gained a 10-race sponsorship from the movie Cowboys & Aliens. Wallace was released after the 2013 season.

Landon Cassill (2014–2015)
For 2014, Landon Cassill moved to the No. 01 car for 2014, becoming the team's primary driver in addition to running the full NASCAR Cup Series campaign with Hillman-Circle Sport LLC. With the switch, Cassill also retained the sponsorship of G&K Services. Cassill gained notoriety over the course of the season for getting the most out of his equipment with fewer resources to work with, consistently running in the top 15 each week.

Ryan Preece (2016)
On January 25, 2016, JD Motorsports announced that Whelen Modified Tour regular Ryan Preece will pilot the 01 full-time for 2016. Preece started the season on a low note, crashing early at Daytona, finishing last. Preece would get his first top ten place finish at Darlington, tenth. Preece didn't make the Chase and finished 17th in points. JD Motorsports announced that Preece would return in 2017, however, Preece left the team to return to Whelen Modified Tour.

Harrison Rhodes (2017)
On February 7, 2017, it was announced that Harrison Rhodes would return to the team, to drive the No. 01 car full-time, replacing Preece. Although Sheldon Creed drove the No. 01 at Road America and Mid-Ohio, with United Rentals as a sponsor for these races.

Vinnie Miller (2018)
On November 28, 2017, it was announced that Vinnie Miller would replace Rhodes in the No. 01 car full-time for the 2018 season. Miller left the team for B. J. McLeod Motorsports near the end of the season, with Lawson Aschenbach, Landon Cassill, and B.J. McLeod finishing the season.

Stephen Leicht (2019)
Stephen Leicht has so far run the full 2019 season in the No. 01 car.

 #6 and B. J. McLeod (2020) 
For 2020, the 01 car was renumbered to No. 6, David Starr moved to No. 6 car. Unfortunately, He lost his ride with this team on May 18 due to sponsorship problems caused by the COVID-19 pandemic. Later it was announced that B.J. McLeod will be moved from the 0 car as Starr's replacement. Jade Buford would make his second NASCAR start at Road America in this car.

 Ryan Vargas (2020–2022)
In September 2020, Ryan Vargas was tabbed to drive the 6 car for six races after he picked up a six-race sponsorship from the popular social networking service TikTok.

Vargas would return to the No. 6 for a full-time schedule in 2021 and finish 26th in the owners points after swapping them with Landon Cassill's No. 4 car.

On May 31, 2022, crew chief Kase Kallenbach was suspended indefinitely for violating Section 4.4.e, which deals with NASCAR Member Code of Conduct Penalty Options and Guidelines. He was replaced by Alex Bird at Charlotte.

On October 31, 2022, it was announced that Vargas would not return to JD Motorsports starting at the last race of 2022 at Phoenix Raceway

Car No. 01/6 results

Car No. 15 history
2017
In midway through the 2017 season, Johnny Davis added a fourth new car as a start-and-park entry to help fund the no. 0, no. 01 and/or no. 4 car. The no. 15 withdrew at Daytona in July and Kentucky Summer race. Reed Sorenson drove at New Hampshire (39th place - brakes), Indianapolis (38th place - vibration)  Iowa (39th place - transmission), and Charlotte (37th place - electrical).

Multiple drivers (2018)

This team was announced to go full-time in 2018 with part-time drivers Joe Nemechek, Reed Sorenson, and others. However, in February it was announced Matt Mills would drive the car full-time starting at Atlanta. Nemechek would drive the car at Daytona. But after 5 attempts by Mills (including a DNQ in his fifth attempt at Texas) and has only one finish better than 36th (27th at Las Vegas) along with 2 DNF's, Mills was replaced at Bristol by Nemechek, who finished 19th. Other drivers to run the No. 15 in 2018 include B.J. McLeod, Brandon Hightower, Katherine Legge and Quin Houff.

 B. J. McLeod (2019)
In 2019, B. J. McLeod has run 22 races for the No. 15 in 2019 With some part-time drivers such as Tyler Matthews (7 races),  (1 race), Ryan Vargas (1 race), Stephen Leicht (1 race), and Stefan Parsons (1 race).

 Colby Howard (2020–2021)
For 2020, It was announced that Colby Howard would drive this car for 20 races. While Robby Lyons joined in for the first three Xfinity races in 2020 and spring Talladega race. Later Ryan Vargas returned to this car in June 2020 on a multi-race deal. Jeffrey Earnhardt later drove this car on road-course tracks.

Howard was announced as the full-time driver for the car for the 2021 season on December 14, 2020. Howard left the team following Darlington after signing a deal to drive McAnally-Hilgemann Racing's No. 91 for the 2022 season. The 15 team was shut down.

Car No. 15 results

Car No. 87 history
In an alliance with NEMCO Motorsports, Davis fielded a third car sharing the number 87 with NEMCO and Rick Ware Racing. Daryl Harr and Kevin Lepage each ran three races for the team, and Tim Schendel ran one race at Iowa.

References

External links
 
 

2002 establishments in South Carolina
American auto racing teams
NASCAR teams